On 13 May 1981, in St. Peter's Square in Vatican City, Pope John Paul II was shot and wounded by Mehmet Ali Ağca while he was entering the square. The Pope was struck twice and suffered severe blood loss. Ağca was apprehended immediately and later sentenced to life in prison by an Italian court. The Pope later forgave Ağca for the assassination attempt. He was pardoned by Italian president Carlo Azeglio Ciampi at the Pope's request and was deported to Turkey in June 2000. Ağca converted to Roman Catholicism in 2007.

Attempted assassination

In 1979 The New York Times reported that Agca, whom it called "the self-confessed killer of an Istanbul newspaperman" (Abdi İpekçi, editor of the Turkish newspaper Milliyet), had described the Pope as "the masked leader of the crusades" and threatened to shoot him if he did not cancel his planned visit to Turkey, which went ahead in late November 1979. The paper also said (on 28 November 1979) that the killing would be in revenge for the then still ongoing attack on the Grand Mosque in Mecca, which had begun on 20 November, and which he blamed on the United States or Israel.

Beginning in August 1980, Ağca, under the alias of Vilperi, began criss-crossing the Mediterranean region, changing passports and identities, perhaps to hide his point of origin in Sofia, Bulgaria. He entered Rome on 10 May 1981, coming by train from Milan. According to Ağca's later testimony, he met with three accomplices in Rome, one a fellow Turk and two Bulgarians, with the operation being commanded by Zilo Vassilev, the Bulgarian military attaché in Italy. He said that he was assigned this mission by Turkish mafioso Bekir Çelenk in Bulgaria. According to Ağca, the plan was for him and the back-up gunman Oral Çelik to open fire on the pope in St. Peter's Square and escape to the Bulgarian embassy under the cover of the panic generated by a small explosion.

On 13 May, Ağca sat in the square, writing postcards and waiting for the Pope to arrive. When the Pope passed through a crowd of supporters, Ağca fired four shots at 17:17 with a 9mm Browning Hi-Power semi-automatic pistol, and critically wounded him. He fled the scene as the crowd was in shock and disposed of the pistol by throwing it under a truck, but was grabbed by Vatican security chief Camillo Cibin, a nun, and several spectators who prevented him from firing more shots or escaping, and he was arrested. Two bullets hit John Paul II; one of them in his torso, narrowly missing vital organs, and a second hit his left index finger. Two bystanders were also injured: Ann Odre, of Buffalo, New York, was struck in the chest, and Rose Hall was slightly wounded in the arm. The Pope was immediately rushed to the hospital while the authorities combed the site for evidence. Çelik panicked and fled without setting off his bomb or opening fire.

Incarceration of Ağca
Ağca was sentenced in July 1981 to life imprisonment for the assassination attempt, but was pardoned by Italian president Carlo Azeglio Ciampi in June 2000 at the Pope's request. He was then extradited to Turkey, where he was imprisoned for the 1979 murder of left-wing journalist Abdi İpekçi and two bank raids carried out in the 1970s. Despite a plea for early release in November 2004, a Turkish court announced that he would not be eligible for release until 2010. Nonetheless he was released on parole on 12 January 2006. However, on 20 January 2006, the Turkish Supreme Court ruled that his time served in Italy could not be deducted from his Turkish sentence and he was returned to jail. Ağca was released from prison on 18 January 2010, after almost 29 years behind bars.

Relationship with Pope John Paul II
Following the shooting, Pope John Paul II asked people to "pray for my brother [Ağca] ... whom I have sincerely forgiven." In 1983, he and Ağca met and spoke privately at Rome's Rebibbia Prison, where Ağca was being held. Ağca reportedly kissed the Pope's ring at the conclusion of their visit; some mistakenly thought the Pope was hearing Ağca's confession. The Pope was also in touch with Ağca's family over the years, meeting his mother in 1987 and his brother, Muezzin Ağca, a decade later.

Although Ağca was quoted as saying that "to me [the Pope] was the incarnation of all that is capitalism", and attempted to murder him, Ağca developed a friendship with the pontiff. In early February 2005, during the Pope's illness, Ağca sent a letter to the Pope wishing him well.

Motivations for the assassination attempt
Several theories exist concerning Ağca's assassination attempt. One, which was initially propagated in the American media and strongly advocated since the early 1980s by Michael Ledeen and Claire Sterling among others, was that the assassination attempt had originated from Moscow and that the KGB had instructed the Bulgarian and East German secret services to carry out the mission. The Bulgarian Secret Service was allegedly instructed by the KGB to assassinate the Pope because of his support of Poland's Solidarity movement, seeing it as one of the most significant threats to Soviet hegemony in Eastern Europe. Noam Chomsky and Edward S. Herman instead term this as the spread of "disinformation as news" in their book Manufacturing Consent (1988), as they say there was no evidence to support this claim, while Wolfgang Achtner of The Independent dubbed it "one of the most successful cases—certainly the most publicized—of disinformation."

Ağca himself has given multiple conflicting statements on the assassination at different times. Attorney Antonio Marini stated: "Ağca has manipulated all of us, telling hundreds of lies, continually changing versions, forcing us to open tens of different investigations". Originally, Ağca claimed to be a member of the Marxist Popular Front for the Liberation of Palestine (PFLP), but they denied any ties to him.

The "Bulgarian Connection"
Following the assassination attempt, Ağca made claims while in custody that prior to the attempt he had made several trips to Sofia, Bulgaria, where he claimed to have had contacts with a Bulgarian agent in Rome whose cover was the Bulgarian national airline office. Soon after the shooting, Sergei Antonov, a Bulgarian working in Rome for Balkan Air, was arrested based on Ağca's testimony and accused of being the Bulgarian agent who masterminded the plot. In 1986, after a three-year trial, he was found not guilty. 

According to the CIA's chief of staff in Turkey, Paul Henze, Ağca later stated that in Sofia, he was once approached by the Bulgarian Secret Service and Turkish mafiosi, who offered him three million German marks to assassinate the Pope. Some writers, including Edward S. Herman, co-author with Frank Brodhead of The Rise and Fall of the Bulgarian Connection (1986), and Michael Parenti, believed Ağca's story was dubious as Ağca made no claims of Bulgarian involvement until he had been isolated in solitary confinement and visited by Italian Military Intelligence (SISMI) agents. On 25 September 1991, former CIA analyst Melvin A. Goodman (now Senior Fellow at the Center for International Policy) claimed that his colleagues, following orders, had falsified their analysis to support the accusation. He declared to the US Senate intelligence committee that "the CIA hadn't any proof" concerning this alleged "Bulgarian connection". 

Neither the Severino Santiapichi court nor the investigation by judge Franco Ionta found evidence that SISMI planted Ağca's story. A French lawyer, Christian Roulette, who authored books blaming Western intelligence agencies for the assassination attempt, testified in court that the documentary evidence he referred to actually did not exist.

Grey Wolves
Le Monde diplomatique alleged that Abdullah Çatlı, a leader of the Grey Wolves, had organised the assassination attempt "in exchange for the sum of 3 million German Marks" for the Grey Wolves. In Rome, Catli declared to the judge in 1985 "that he had been contacted by the BND, the German intelligence agency, which would have promised him a nice sum of money if he implicated the Russian and Bulgarian services in the assassination attempt against the Pope". According to colonel Alparslan Türkes, the founder of the Grey Wolves, "Catli has cooperated in the frame of a secret service working for the good of the state".

The Mitrokhin Commission's claims

According to Italian newspaper Corriere della Sera, documents recovered from former East German intelligence services confirm the 1981 assassination attempt against Pope John Paul II was ordered by the Soviet KGB and assigned to Bulgarian and East German agents with the Stasi to co-ordinate the operation and cover up the traces afterwards.  However, Markus Wolf, former Stasi spy-master, has denied any links, and claimed the files had already been sent in 1995.

In March 2006, pending national elections, the controversial Mitrokhin Commission, set up by Silvio Berlusconi and headed by Forza Italia senator Paolo Guzzanti, supported once again the Bulgarian theory, which had been denounced by John Paul II during his travel to Bulgaria. Senator Guzzanti claimed that "leaders of the former Soviet Union were behind the assassination attempt", alleging that "the leadership of the Soviet Union took the initiative to eliminate Pope John Paul" because of his support for Solidarity, relaying "this decision to the military secret services" (and not the KGB). The report's claims were based on recent computer analysis of photographs that purported to demonstrate Antonov's presence in St Peter's Square during the shooting and on information brought by the French anti-terrorist judge Jean-Louis Bruguière, a controversial figure whose last feat was to indict Rwandese president Paul Kagame, claiming he had deliberately provoked the 1994 Rwandan genocide against his own ethnic group in order to take power. According to Le Figaro, Bruguière, who is in close contacts as well with Moscow as with Washington, D.C., including intelligence agents, has been accused by many of his colleagues of "privileging the reason of state over law."

Both Russia and Bulgaria condemned the report. "For Bulgaria, this case closed with the court decision in Rome in March 1986", Foreign Ministry spokesman Dimitar Tsanchev said, while also recalling the Pope's comments during his May 2002 visit to Bulgaria. Senator Guzzanti said that the commission had decided to re-open the report's chapter on the assassination attempt in 2005, after the Pope wrote about it in his last book, Memory and Identity: Conversations Between Millenniums. The Pope wrote that he was convinced the shooting was not Ağca's initiative and that "someone else masterminded it and someone else commissioned it". The Mitrokhin Commission also claimed Romano Prodi, a former Prime Minister of Italy, was the "KGB's man in Italy".

At the end of December 2006, Mario Scaramella, one of the main informers of senator Guzzanti, was arrested and charged, among other things, of defamation. Rome's prosecutor Pietro Salvitti, in charge of the investigations concerning Mario Scaramella, cited by La Repubblica, showed that Nicolò Pollari, head of SISMI, the Italian military intelligence agency and indicted in the Imam Rapito affair, as well as SISMI n°2, Marco Mancini, arrested in July 2006 for the same reason, were some of the informers, alongside Mario Scaramella, of senator Paolo Guzzanti. Beside targeting Romano Prodi and his staff, this "network", according to Pietro Salvitti's words, also aimed at defaming General Giuseppe Cucchi (current director of the CESIS), Milan's judges Armando Spataro, in charge of the Imam Rapito case, and Guido Salvini, as well as La Repubblica reporters Carlo Bonini and Giuseppe D'Avanzo, who discovered the Yellowcake forgery affair. The investigation also showed a connection between Scaramella and the CIA, in particular through Filippo Marino, one of Scaramella's closest partners since the 1990s and co-founder of the ECPP, who lives today in the US. Marino has acknowledged in an interview an association with former and active CIA officers, including Robert Lady, former CIA station chief in Milan, indicted by prosecutor Armando Spataro for having coordinated the abduction of Abu Omar, the Imam Rapito affair.

Spies in the Vatican
In 2009, journalist and former army intelligence officer John Koehler published Spies in the Vatican: The Soviet Union's Cold War Against the Catholic Church. Mining mostly East German and Polish secret police archives, Koehler claims the attempt was "KGB-backed" and gives details.

Fatima and possible Vatican connection

On 26 June 2000, Pope John Paul II released the "Third Secret of Fatima" in which he said that Ağca's assassination attempt was the fulfilment of this Secret. 13 May (the date of the assassination attempt) is the anniversary of the first apparition of the Virgin Mary to the three children of Fatima, something the Pope has always regarded as significant, attributing his survival on that day to her protection. Some doubt the Church's full disclosure of the contents of this Secret, believing that it actually predicted the Apocalypse. While in prison on remand, Ağca was widely reported to have developed an obsession with Fatima and during the trial claimed that he was the second coming of Jesus Christ and called on the Vatican to release the Third Secret.

On 31 March 2005, just two days prior to the Pope's death, Ağca gave an interview to the Italian newspaper La Repubblica. He claimed to be working on a book about the assassination attempt. La Repubblica quoted Ağca claiming at length that he had accomplices in the Vatican who helped him with the assassination attempt, saying "the devil is inside Vatican's wall". He also said:

Emanuela Orlandi, the daughter of a Vatican employee, disappeared at age 15 on 22 June 1983. Anonymous phone calls offered her release in exchange for the release of Ağca. Archbishop Paul Marcinkus was alleged to be part of the kidnapping, although no charges were ever laid.

Ağca subsequently denied having made such claims following the publication of the interview. In 2010 Ağca asserted that Cardinal Agostino Casaroli had been behind the assassination attempt. However, when Ağca published his memoirs in 2013, his story changed completely, writing that the Iranian government and supreme leader Ayatollah Khomeini ordered the assassination attempt on John Paul II.

In fiction
The A. J. Quinnell novel In the Name of the Father describes the aftermath of the plot to assassinate the Pope.  Church leaders are shocked to discover that the attempt was orchestrated by the highest levels of the Kremlin.

On the online timeline of the 2004 alternate history mockumentary C.S.A.: The Confederate States of America, in which the Confederate States of America wins the American Civil War and annexes the rest of the United States, an assassination attempt on Pope John Paul II still occurs. However, it occurs in New York City rather than in St. Peter's Square. The assailant, a Baptist from Tennessee named Maynard Brimley, shoots the Pope and kills a bystander. Although the Pope visits Brimley in prison to forgive him for his actions, Brimley is tried and executed, partly to appease international pressure.

The Tom Clancy novel Red Rabbit incorporates the assassination attempt, following the "Moscow origin" theory.

See also
 Juan María Fernández y Krohn
 Bojinka Plot

References

Further viewing
 
 Meissen, Randall J. Living Miracles: The Spiritual Sons of John Paul the Great, Alpharetta, GA, Mission Network: 2011.  Several sections of this work discuss the assassination, its cultural impact on Catholic seminarians, and the protection of the pope attributed to Our Lady of Fatima.

External links

 Records of the RFE Rome Bureau on Antonov trial (boxes 16–19), Blinken Open Society Archives

 
1981 in Vatican City
1981 in Christianity
May 1981 events in Europe
1981 crimes in Italy
John Paul II
History of the papacy
Modern history of Italy
Crime in Vatican City
Assassination Attempt
Grey Wolves (organization) attacks
Non-fatal shootings
Holy See–Turkey relations
Holy See–Italy relations
Italy–Turkey relations